The 2013–14 NJIT Highlanders women's basketball team represents New Jersey Institute of Technology during the 2013–14 NCAA Division I women's basketball season. The Highlanders, led by second year head coach Steve Lanpher, play their home games at the Fleisher Center and are in their first year as an Independent after the Great West Conference folded.

Roster

Media
NJIT will provide audio of all home contests on Highlanders-All Access with Matt Provence and Michael Ventola calling the action. Currently no video or radio is expected for the games.

Schedule

|-
!colspan=9| Regular Season

See also
 2013–14 NJIT Highlanders men's basketball team

References

NJIT Highlanders
NJIT Highlanders women's basketball seasons
NJIT Highlanders Women's B
NJIT Highlanders Women's B